The House in Dragon Street (German: Das Haus in der Dragonerstrasse ) is a 1921 German silent crime film directed by Richard Oswald and starring Edmund Löwe, Werner Krauss and Lilly Flohr. The film premiered in Berlin on 24 June 1921.

Cast
 Edmund Löwe as Der alte Uhl 
 Werner Krauss as Walter, sein Sohn 
 Lilly Flohr as Lia, seine Tochter 
 Paul Bildt as Zigarrenhändler Paulsen 
 Ellen Bargi as Martha, seine Frau 
 Eugen Jensen as Der Junggeselle 
 Aenne Ullstein as Ein Mädchen, Walters Freundin 
 Theodor Loos as Funke, Lias Bräutigam

References

Bibliography
 Grange, William. Cultural Chronicle of the Weimar Republic.Scarecrow Press, 2008.

External links

1921 films
Films of the Weimar Republic
German silent feature films
German crime films
Films directed by Richard Oswald
1921 crime films
German black-and-white films
1920s German films
1920s German-language films